Linlongopterus is a genus of pteranodontoid pterodactyloid pterosaur from the Early Cretaceous of China. It is known from a partial skull and mandible first named and described in 2015 by Rodrigues et al.. The only known specimen was found in the Jiufotang Formation of the Liaoning Province or China, and lived around 120 million years ago. The full binomial of the taxon is Linlongopterus jennyae, with the generic name translating from the Chinese "forest" (lin) and "dragon" (long), and the Greek "wing" (pteros), while the species name honours Elfriede Kellner, nicknamed Jenny, a supporter of paleontology. The proper word for wing in ancient Greek is however pteron (πτερόν).

Linlongopterus was placed in a phylogenetic analysis to determine its relationships. The taxon was located within Dsungaripteroidea (sensu Kellner), which included Azhdarchoidea, Dsungaripteridae, and Pteranodontoidea, all of which were mostly dissolved due to the few remains known from Linlongopterus. Based on the teeth presence and anatomy, Linlongopterus was excluded from Azhdarchoidea and Dsungaripteridae, which are toothless and have very specialized teeth respectively. As such, Linlongopterus was placed within Pteranodontoidea. Within Pteranodontoidea, pteranodontids have no teeth, and istiodactylids have triangular teeth, different from the elongate teeth of Linlongopterus. The taxon does not have the crests on its jaws, which excludes it from derived Anhangueridae, leaving a position basal within Anhangueria most likely.

References

Pteranodontoids
Albian life
Early Cretaceous pterosaurs of Asia
Albian genus extinctions